In mathematics, the Grothendieck–Ogg–Shafarevich formula describes the Euler characteristic of a complete curve with coefficients in an  abelian variety or constructible sheaf, in terms of local data involving the Swan conductor.  and  proved the formula for abelian varieties with tame ramification over curves, and  extended the formula to constructible sheaves over a curve .

Statement

Suppose that F is a constructible sheaf over a genus g smooth projective curve C, of rank n outside a finite set X of points where it has stalk 0. Then

where Sw is the Swan conductor at a point.

References

Elliptic curves
Abelian varieties